The Niagara Falls Flyers were a Tier II Junior "A" ice hockey team and member of the Southern Ontario Junior A Hockey League. The team played home games at the Niagara Falls Memorial Arena in Niagara Falls, Ontario.

History
In 1972, the Ontario Hockey Association's Tier I Junior "A" Niagara Falls Flyers were sold and relocated to Sudbury, Ontario as the Sudbury Wolves. They were replaced in Niagara Falls by the Tier II Flyers the same year.

They played four season in the Southern Ontario Junior A Hockey League. In 1976, the Tier II Flyers made way for the St. Catharines Black Hawks who were relocated as the second incarnation of the Tier I Niagara Falls Flyers.

Season-by-Season results

Playoffs
1973 Lost Quarter-final
Windsor Spitfires defeated Niagara Falls Flyers 4-games-to-3
1974 Lost Quarter-final
Welland Sabres defeated Niagara Falls Flyers 4-games-to-1
1975 Lost Quarter-final
Chatham Maroons defeated Niagara Falls Flyers 4-games-to-1 with 1 tie
1976 DNQ

Notable alumni
Cam Botting
Willi Plett

External links
OHA Website

Defunct ice hockey teams in Canada
Ice hockey teams in Ontario
Sport in Niagara Falls, Ontario